Thiago Henrique Feltri (born 18 May 1985 in Fernão), known as Thiago Feltri, is a Brazilian footballer who plays for Portuguesa as a left back.

Career
On 4 January 2010 Atlético Mineiro released the left-back after five years and is now a free agent. In February 2010 Atletico Goianiense signed the former Atlético Mineiro and Goiás left-back until December 2011.

Honours
Atlético Mineiro
Campeonato Brasileiro Série B: 2006
Campeonato Mineiro: 2007

External links

1985 births
Living people
Brazilian footballers
Association football defenders
Campeonato Brasileiro Série A players
Campeonato Brasileiro Série B players
Clube Atlético Mineiro players
Goiás Esporte Clube players
Atlético Clube Goianiense players
CR Vasco da Gama players
Joinville Esporte Clube players
Clube Atlético Bragantino players
Esporte Clube Tigres do Brasil players
Associação Portuguesa de Desportos players